Turka Raion was a raion (administrative unit) in Lviv Oblast in western Ukraine. Its administrative center was the city of Turka. The raion was abolished on 18 July 2020 as part of the administrative reform of Ukraine, which reduced the number of raions of Lviv Oblast to seven. The area of Turka Raion was merged into Sambir Raion.

It was established in 1939.

At the time of disestablishment, the raion consisted of two hromadas:
 Borynia settlement hromada with the administration in the urban-type settlement of Borynia;
 Turka urban hromada with the administration in Turka.

See also
 Administrative divisions of Lviv Oblast

References

External links
 trda.lv.ukrtel.net 

Former raions of Lviv Oblast
1939 establishments in Ukraine
Ukrainian raions abolished during the 2020 administrative reform